Alfred Kolleritsch (16 February 1931 – 29 May 2020) was an Austrian journalist, poet and philosopher. 

He was born in Eichfeld, Austria. He was the founder of the literary magazine . He contributes to the Grazer Autorenversammlung. He won the Petrarca-Preis in 1978, and was since 2010 part of the jury.

Kolleritsch died on 29 May 2020 in Graz, age 89.

See also
Austrian literature

References

1931 births
2020 deaths
Austrian journalists
Austrian male poets
Austrian philosophers
People from Südoststeiermark District